Graham Guit is a French director and screenwriter born on 3 May 1968 in Neuilly-sur-Seine, France.

Filmography 

 1997  : Le ciel est à nous with Romane Bohringer, Melvil Poupaud and Élodie Bouchez
 1998  : Les Kidnappeurs with Melvil Poupaud, Élodie Bouchez and Romain Duris
 2003  : Le Pacte du silence with Gérard Depardieu, Élodie Bouchez and Carmen Maura
 2008  : Hello Goodbye with Gérard Depardieu, Fanny Ardant and Manu Payet

References 

1968 births
Living people
French directors
French screenwriters